Msila may refer to:

 M'Sila, Algeria, the capital of M'Sila Province, Algeria
 M'Sila Province, Algeria
 Msila, Morocco, a municipality in Taza Province, Morocco